Jennifer Su (born 12 August 1968 as Tsou Hai-ying 鄒海音) is an American South African radio and television personality of Chinese origin. She is best known as the financial news anchor for The Africa Business Report on Sky News. She is also a former presenter of The Hollywood Report on the Gareth Cliff show when he was still on 5FM. During the period of 2006–2008 Su was a prime time anchor for Star News Asia in Hong Kong.

Having won a "Taiwan Idol" TV singing contest, Jen Su released 4 albums.

Publications 
 2015 – From Z to A-Lister: Building Your Personal Brand

References

External links 

 
 

Living people
1968 births
American emigrants to South Africa
American people of Chinese descent
South African people of Chinese descent
South African women television presenters
Taiwanese idols
People from Jenkintown, Pennsylvania
Hong Kong women television presenters